Nerita signata is a species of sea snail, a marine gastropod mollusk in the family Neritidae.

Description
The size of the shell attains 26 mm.

Distribution
This species occurs off Papua New Guinea

References

External links
 Lamarck, [J.-B. M. de. (1822). Histoire naturelle des animaux sans vertèbres. Tome sixième, 2me partie. Paris: published by the Author, 232 pp]
 Martens, E. von. (1856-1889). Die Gattungen Nerita und Neritopsis. In: W. Kobelt, Ed. Systematisches Conchylien-Cabinet von Martini und Chemnitz. Neu herausgegeben und vervollständigt. Zweiten Bandes elfte Abtheilung. 2 (11): 1-147, plates A, 1-15. Nürnberg: Bauer & Raspe
 Wood, W. (1828). Supplement to the Index Testaceologicus; or A catalogue of Shells, British and Foreign. Richard Taylor, London. Iv [+1 + 59 pp., plates 1-8,]
 Mörch, O. A. L. (1852-1853). Catalogus conchyliorum quae reliquit D. Alphonso d'Aguirra & Gadea Comes de Yoldi, Regis Daniae Cubiculariorum Princeps, Ordinis Dannebrogici in Prima Classe & Ordinis Caroli Tertii Eques. 
 Dunker, W. (1869). Museum Godeffroy. Catalog IV. Hamburg. xxxix, 139 pp

Neritidae
Taxa named by Jean-Baptiste Lamarck
Gastropods described in 1822